Togüí is a town and municipality in Boyacá Department, Colombia, part of the subregion of the Ricaurte Province. It borders the municipalities of San José de Pare, Arcabuco, Moniquirá, Chitaraque and Gámbita.

Etymology 
Togüí in Chibcha means either "river of the wife" or "house of the dog".

History 

Modern Togüí was founded on September 23, 1821, by Francisco de Paula Santander.

The mayor of Togüí, who was elected at the regional elections of October 2015, Jansson Téllez Rodríguez, has been accused of fraud and internalized. Upon this, Pedro Pablo Salas has been installed as interim mayor.

Economy 
Main economical activities of Togüí are agriculture and livestock farming. Agricultural products cultivated in the rural areas of the municipality are coffee, sugar cane, maize, bananas and yuca.

Born in Togüí 
 Pablo Hurtado, Olympic cyclist

Gallery

References 

Municipalities of Boyacá Department
Populated places established in 1821
Muisca Confederation
Muysccubun